Caol (Gaelic: An Caol) is a village near Fort William, in the Highland council area of Scotland.

The name "Caol" is from the Gaelic for "narrow", in this case the narrow water between Loch Linnhe and Loch Eil.

The Caledonian Canal passes by to the north-west of Caol, while the Great Glen Way long distance footpath passes through the village before following the canal towpath.

The village is largely residential, and has three primary schools, Caol Primary School, St Columba's R.C Primary School and Bun-sgoil Ghàidhlig Loch Abar 

The local shinty team is Kilmallie Shinty Club, who play at Canal Park in the west of Caol.

References

Populated places in Lochaber
Populated coastal places in Scotland